Bellipady Ramanath Rai (born 13 September 1952) is an Indian politician who  was a Minister in  Government of Karnataka from 23 May 2013 to 15 May 2018.

Biography
Rai was born 13 September 1952 to Bellipady Perne Narayan Rai and Girija Rai in Perne, a village in the erstwhile South Kanara region of the Madras State, now a part of Karnataka's Dakshina Kannada district. He entered politics when he became a member of the Indian National Congress. He has represented the Bantwal constituency in the Karnataka Legislative Assembly since 1985 until he lost it to his cousin B. Nagaraja Shetty in 2004. He however won the same constituency in 2008. In his long career as a legislator in the Karnataka Assembly he has served as minister holding various portfolios.

He also won 2013 Assembly election from Bantwal. He has been given the portfolio of Minister for Forest, Environment and Ecology. He lost to Rajesh Naik of BJP, by a margin of 15,000 votes, in 2018 Assembly elections.

References

State cabinet ministers of Karnataka
People from Dakshina Kannada district
Karnataka MLAs 2008–2013
Karnataka MLAs 2013–2018
Living people
1952 births
Indian National Congress politicians from Karnataka